Pink Revolution is the third full-length studio album by South Korean girl group Apink. It was released on September 26, 2016 following a hiatus of one year and two months. The title track, "Only One", was used to promote the album along with B-tracks "Boom Pow Love" and "Ding Dong".

Release

The full album was released on September 26, 2016 at midnight. Shortly following the album's release, the title track topped seven Korean music charts.

Singles
The first single from the album, "The Wave" (네가 손짓해주면), was written by group leader Park Cho-rong and was released on April 19, 2016, as a 5th Anniversary song for Apink's fans.
Pink Revolution's title track, "Only One", was released on September 26, 2016, and was written and arranged by Black Eyed Pilseung.

Track listing

References

External links
 
 

Apink albums
2016 albums
Korean-language albums
Cube Entertainment albums
Kakao M albums